Valera is city in Venezuela.

Valera may also refer to:

Places
 Valera, Texas, unincorporated community in United States
 Valera District, Peru
 Valera Municipality, Venezuela

Other uses
 Valera (crater), a tiny crater in the Mare Imbrium region of the Moon
 Reina-Valera, a Spanish translation of the Bible

People with the surname
 Éamon de Valera (1882–1975), Irish-American politician
 Federico Coullaut-Valera Mendigutia (1912–1989), Spanish sculptor 
 Juan Valera (footballer) (born 1984), Spanish footballer
 Juan Valera y Alcalá-Galiano (1824–1905), Spanish author
 Lorenzo Coullaut Valera (1876–1932), Spanish sculptor
 Lourdes Valera (1963–2012), Venezuelan actress
 Rodman Valera (born 1982), Venezuelan volleyball player
  (1927–2013), Venezuelan sculptor

See also 
 
 
 Valer (disambiguation)
 Valeria (disambiguation)
 Valerie (disambiguation)
 Valérien (disambiguation)